McManaman is a surname. Notable people with the surname include:

Callum McManaman (born 1991), English footballer
Clint McManaman (born 1980), American drummer
Edward Peter McManaman (1900–1964), American Catholic bishop
Steve McManaman (born 1972), English footballer

See also
McMenamin

Anglicised Irish-language surnames